Yahya Berrabah (born 13 October 1981 in Oujda) is a Moroccan long jumper. He is a five-time participant at the World Championships in Athletics (2003–2011) and has twice represented his country at the Olympic Games. He was the 2008 African Champion in the long jump. His personal best of 8.40 metres is the Moroccan national record.

He finished seventh at the 2002 African Championships. At the 2006 African Championships he finished eighth in the long jump and seventh in the triple jump. He won the gold medal at the 2008 African Championships. He competed at the World Championships 2003, 2005 and 2007 as well as the Olympic Games in 2004 and 2008 without reaching the final.

He broke the Moroccan national record in Rabat on 23 May 2009: his jump of 8.38 metres at the Meeting Mohammed VI d' Athlétisme beat Younés Moudrik's record which had stood for almost nine years. He improved this to 8.40 m at the 2009 Jeux de la Francophonie in Beirut – a mark which won him the gold medal and a games record. At the IAAF Grand Prix in Zagreb on 31 August 2008 he tested positive for cannabis and was subsequently handed a public reprimand. He performed less well in 2010, failing to pass the eight-metre mark, but cleared 8.37 m in July 2011 in Barcelona. He went on to finish fourth at the 2011 World Championships in Athletics.

Berrabah failed an out-of-competition drug test for EPO in November 2011 and was initially suspended for two years. The ban was later extended to 4 years, ending 5 January 2016.

Major competition record

References

External links

1981 births
Living people
People from Oujda
Moroccan male long jumpers
Olympic athletes of Morocco
Athletes (track and field) at the 2004 Summer Olympics
Athletes (track and field) at the 2008 Summer Olympics
World Athletics Championships athletes for Morocco
Doping cases in athletics
Moroccan sportspeople in doping cases
Mediterranean Games gold medalists for Morocco
Mediterranean Games medalists in athletics
Athletes (track and field) at the 2009 Mediterranean Games
Athletes (track and field) at the 2018 Mediterranean Games
Mediterranean Games gold medalists in athletics
Islamic Solidarity Games competitors for Morocco
Islamic Solidarity Games medalists in athletics